The 2017 Coral Welsh Open was a professional snooker tournament that took place from 13 to 19 February 2017 at the Motorpoint Arena in Cardiff. It was the fourteenth ranking event of the 2016/2017 season.

The 2017 Welsh Open was being held as part of a new Home Nations Series, introduced in the 2016/2017 season with the new English Open, Northern Ireland Open and Scottish Open tournaments. The tournament's trophy was renamed to the Ray Reardon Trophy in honour of six-time world champion Ray Reardon.

The defending champion Ronnie O'Sullivan lost 3–4 against Mark Davis in the last 64.

Stuart Bingham won his first Welsh Open title and fourth ranking title overall, beating Judd Trump 9–8 in the final.

Prize fund
The breakdown of prize money is shown below.

Winner: £70,000
Runner-up: £30,000
Semi-finals: £20,000
Quarter-finals: £10,000
Last 16: £6,000
Last 32: £3,500
Last 64: £2,500

Highest break: £2,000
Total: £366,000

The "rolling 147 prize" for a maximum break stood at £10,000.

Main draw

Top half

Section 1

Section 2

Section 3

Section 4

Bottom half

Section 5

Section 6

Section 7

Section 8

Finals

Final

Century breaks

Total: 55

 144  Mark Davis
 143, 133, 111, 102  Neil Robertson
 142  Fergal O'Brien
 140, 131, 102  Judd Trump
 136, 123, 118, 103  Hossein Vafaei
 136  Yan Bingtao
 132, 113  Anthony Hamilton
 131  Mei Xiwen
 130  Lee Walker
 128, 101  Stuart Carrington
 128  Michael White
 127, 103, 101, 101  Stuart Bingham
 126  Graeme Dott
 120  Mitchell Mann
 118  Andy Hicks
 117  Joe Perry
 116, 113  Kurt Maflin
 115  Robert Milkins

 114  Aditya Mehta
 113, 101, 100  Barry Hawkins
 109, 101  Anthony McGill
 109  Josh Boileau
 108, 107, 101  Jimmy Robertson
 108  Gareth Allen
 106  Sanderson Lam
 105  Robin Hull
 105  Igor Figueiredo
 105  Craig Steadman
 104  Ricky Walden
 102  Jimmy White
 101  Ronnie O'Sullivan
 101  Allan Taylor
 101  Zhou Yuelong
 100  Ryan Day
 100  Stephen Maguire
 100  Robbie Williams

References

Home Nations Series
2017
2017 in snooker
2017 in Welsh sport
February 2017 sports events in the United Kingdom
Sports competitions in Cardiff